The Benson Elementary School, at 3440 N. 3000 West in Benson, Utah, was built in 1935.  It was listed on the National Register of Historic Places in 1985.

It was a PWA Moderne-style elementary school, built of locally manufactured yellow bricks. One wing had a parapeted gable roof.

Originally built as a local elementary school, in 1969 the building began to be used for the Cache Instructional Workshop, a vocational school for people with disabilities. Years later the program was moved, and the building was demolished sometime between 1993 and 2002.

References

Schools in Utah
PWA Moderne architecture in Utah
National Register of Historic Places in Cache County, Utah
Buildings and structures completed in 1935